Belmont is a railway station on Metra’s BNSF Line located on the outskirts of Downers Grove, Illinois in the small community of Belmont. The station is on Belmont Road  from Union Station, the east end of the line. As of 2018, Belmont is the 25th busiest of Metra's 236 non-downtown stations, with an average of 1,408 weekday boardings.

Like Downers Grove Main Street, Belmont has connections to both Pace Buses, and the Village's own Grove Commuter Shuttle. Unlike the stations at Main Street and Fairview Avenue however, Belmont has parking vendors.

The station underwent major renovations in the late 2000s. In order to reduce level crossing accidents, an underpass was installed. Belmont Road was re-routed underneath the tracks. Demolition began in late 2008, construction started in 2010, and the new underpass and pedestrian tunnel opened in 2012. The $60 million project was funded by Metra, BNSF, DuPage County, and the State of Illinois.

Many trains during the weekday rush hours skip this station. In addition, all weekend trains stop here.

Bus connections

Grove Commuter Shuttle
  West Route

References

External links

Metra – Stations – Belmont station (Metra)
Belmont Underpass Construction Updates (Village of Downers Grove)
Downer's Grove-Belmont Avenue (Mike's Railroad Crossing Website)
Station from Google Maps Street View

Metra stations in Illinois
Downers Grove, Illinois
Railway stations in DuPage County, Illinois
Railway stations in the United States opened in 1996